Shooting in Vain is a 2018 American drama film directed by Jared Januschka, starring Sebastian Gregory, Diana Hopper, Isabel Lucas, Alexandra Park and Ryan Shoos.

Cast
 Sebastian Gregory as Maxfield Young
 Diana Hopper as Raine Bennett
 Isabel Lucas as Kali Stewart
 Alexandra Park as Lucy
 Ryan Shoos as Jimmy
 Michael L. McNulty as Calvin
 Maria Maestas McCann as Diane
 Colleen Kelly as Jane
 Jackson Odell as Chuck

Release
The film premiered at Dances With Films on 14 June 2018.

Reception
Paul Parcellin of Film Threat gave the film a score of 7.5/10 and called it an "portrait of an individual who is difficult to pin down, not because he’s a self-aggrandizing liar — we’ve seen some world-class examples of that in recent times — but one who acknowledges that most of us are less than honest with ourselves, and therefore unlikely to tell others the truth, the whole truth and nothing but the truth."

Keith Uhlich of The Hollywood Reporter called the film "ludicrously somber" and wrote that it "deserves a smack".

References

External links
 
 

American drama films
2018 drama films